is a side scrolling arcade beat 'em up platform game developed by SNK for the Neo Geo in 1994. It was also released on the Neo Geo CD, and the Wii Virtual Console. The game has been re-released as part of SNK Arcade Classics Vol. 1, on May 1, 2008, and in the ACA Neo Geo series on PlayStation 4 on January 10, 2018. Its development team consisted of former Irem staff members.

It was one of the few Neo Geo games to be dubbed "the 100 mega shock", due to the cartridge being just over 112 mebibits. This was large for the time, at over twice the size of the largest SNES cartridge (Star Ocean, with 48 mebibits). Later cartridges would routinely top 100 megabits so the branding was dropped. This was also referred to as a precursor to Metal Slug because of the cartoonish graphics and the robotic vehicles, which are very similar to the Slugs.

Gameplay 

The gameplay style in the game are mostly similar to, heavily derived from and inspired by Double Dragon, The Combatribes, Joe & Mac and Spinmaster. The player, as Roddy (the second player plays as Cathy), must navigate through the stages, collecting items, killing enemies, and defeating a boss at the end of each area. The characters can also execute special moves, done by moving the joystick in certain directions and pressing the attack button, similar to Street Fighter and The King of Fighters fame. Similar to Fatal Fury , Top Hunter features a plane-jumping system: the game field is divided in two lanes between the background and foreground, which the player can jump between at any time to attack enemies or avoid traps. The two fields are not always at the same elevation and one of them may be blocked off at certain points.

The game is split into four planets: Forest, Ice, Wind, and Fire. Depending on what stage is picked first, the layout of the stage will change. For example, if the player picks the Ice world before the Forest world, the Forest world's beginning layout will be different. After completing all 4 worlds, the player is taken to the final stage, where they must rematch with the four bosses and battle the game's antagonist, Captain Klapton.

Players can change various game settings such as game difficulty, and also reproduce the atmosphere of arcade display settings at that time. Players can also compete against each other from all over the world with their high scores.

Synopsis 

The galaxy's top bounty hunters Roddy and Cathy are sent to put a stop to a colony of galactic pirates called the Klaptons who threaten and plunder the cosmos. Four high-ranking members of the Klaptons have taken control of four elemental planets. Big rewards are offered for the captures of Sly, Misty, Mr. Bigman and Dr. Burn. The top hunters battle their forces and destroy the commanders' war machines but they all get away. In the Last Hunt, Roddy and Cathy will have to battle in Captain Klapton's Mothership, defeat the four commanders again and take care of the captain once and for all.

Development

Release

Reception 

In North America, RePlay reported Top Hunter: Roddy & Cathy to be the sixteenth most-popular arcade game at the time. On release, Famitsu scored the Neo Geo version of Top Hunter a 24 out of 40. The four reviewers of Electronic Gaming Monthly gave it a 7 out of 10 average. Two of the reviewers criticized that "the difficulty, even on the hardest setting, is still way too easy", allowing players to breeze through the game very quickly, and thus making it a poor value given the high price of Neo Geo cartridges. However, all four felt that the game was very enjoyable for its brief length due to its numerous techniques, outstanding graphics, bizarre bosses, orchestral music, and ability to move between the foreground and background. Spanish magazine Superjuegos, in its 31st edition, scored the game with a score of 91 out of a maximum of 100, highlighting the graphic work especially with the level bosses and the two planes that the game has.

Retrospective reviews 

Top Hunter: Roddy & Cathy has been met with mixed reception from retrospective reviewers.

In 2014, HobbyConsolas identified Top Hunter as one of the twenty best games for the Neo Geo AES.

Notes

References

External links 
 Top Hunter: Roddy & Cathy at Giant Bomb
 Top Hunter: Roddy & Cathy at Killer List of Videogames
 Top Hunter: Roddy & Cathy at MobyGames

1994 video games
ACA Neo Geo games
Action video games
Arcade video games
Cooperative video games
D4 Enterprise games
Multiplayer and single-player video games
Neo Geo games
Neo Geo CD games
Nintendo Switch games
PlayStation Network games
PlayStation 4 games
Platform games
Side-scrolling beat 'em ups
Side-scrolling platform games
SNK beat 'em ups
SNK Playmore games
Video games about pirates
Video games featuring female protagonists
Video games scored by Masahiko Hataya
Video games set in the future
Video games set on fictional planets
Virtual Console games
Video games developed in Japan
Xbox One games
Hamster Corporation games